The 2021 Pulitzer Prizes were awarded by the Pulitzer Prize Board for work during the 2020 calendar year on June 11, 2021. The awards highlighted coverage of the COVID-19 pandemic, racial unrest, and other major stories in the U.S. that year. Several publications, including The Atlantic and BuzzFeed News, received their first Pulitzers.

Prizes
Winners and finalists for the prizes are listed below, with the winners marked in bold.

Journalism

Letters, Drama, and Music

Special Citations 
A Special Citation was awarded to Darnella Frazier, "for courageously recording the murder of George Floyd, a video that spurred protests against police brutality around the world, highlighting the crucial role of citizens in journalists' quest for truth and justice."

References

Columbia University Graduate School of Journalism
2021 literary awards
2021 awards in the United States
2021 music awards
June 2021 events in the United States